Vidyadhar Guruji Sayanna was an Indian politician, freedom fighter and Gandhian. He was a Member of 1962 Mysore Legislative Assembly (currently Karnataka Legislative Assembly) from Gurmitkal constituency.

Personal life 
Vidyadhar Guruji Sayanna was married to Savitadevi and the couple had four children which includes three sons, and one daughter.

Positions held 

 Member of Mysore Legislative Assembly (Third Assembly 1962–1967).
 Chairman of Hindi Prachar Sabha (for a period)

Election results

1962

1984 
Polling Date: 24-12-1984

Polling Station: Number: 1,127

Average Electors per Polling Station: 681

References 

2017 deaths
Mysore MLAs 1962–1967
Members of the Mysore Legislature
Janata Party politicians
Politicians from Yadgir district
Swatantra Party politicians